José Pastor Catalán (born 16 May 1906, date of death unknown) was a Spanish boxer who competed in the 1924 Summer Olympics. He was eliminated in the second round of the bantamweight class after losing his fight to Jacques Lemouton.

References

1906 births
Year of death missing
Bantamweight boxers
Olympic boxers of Spain
Boxers at the 1924 Summer Olympics
Spanish male boxers